Dutch elm disease (DED) is caused by a member of the sac fungi (Ascomycota) affecting elm trees, and is spread by elm bark beetles. Although believed to be originally native to Asia, the disease was accidentally introduced into America, Europe, and New Zealand. In these regions it has devastated native populations of elms that did not have resistance to the disease. The name "Dutch elm disease" refers to its identification in 1921 and later in the Netherlands by Dutch phytopathologists Bea Schwarz and Christine Buisman, who both worked with professor Johanna Westerdijk. The disease affects species in the genera Ulmus and Zelkova, therefore it is not specific to the Dutch elm hybrid.

Overview 

Dutch elm disease (DED) is caused by ascomycete microfungi. Three species are now recognized:
Ophiostoma ulmi, which afflicted Europe from 1910, reaching North America on imported timber in 1928.
Ophiostoma himal-ulmi, a species endemic to the western Himalaya.
Ophiostoma novo-ulmi, an extremely virulent species from Japan which was first described in Europe and North America in the 1940s and has devastated elms in both continents since the late 1960s.

DED is spread in North America by three species of bark beetles (Family: Curculionidae, Subfamily: Scolytinae):
The native elm bark beetle, Hylurgopinus rufipes.
The smaller European elm bark beetle, Scolytus multistriatus.
The banded elm bark beetle, Scolytus schevyrewi.

In Europe, while S. multistriatus still acts as a vector for infection, it is much less effective than the large elm bark beetle, S. scolytus. H. rufipes can be a vector for the disease, but is inefficient compared to the other vectors. S. schevyrewi was found in 2003 in Colorado and Utah.

Other reported DED vectors include Scolytus sulcifrons, S. pygmaeus, S. laevis, Pteleobius vittatus and Р. kraatzi. Other elm bark beetle species are also likely vectors.

Field resistance
'Field resistance' is an umbrella term covering the various factors by which some elms avoid infection in the first place, rather than survive it. A clear example would be the European White Elm Ulmus laevis which, while having little or no genetic resistance to DED, synthesizes a triterpene, Alnulin, rendering the bark distasteful to the vector beetles, obliging them to look further afield for more suitable elms. Another would be the inability of the beetles to see elms which did not break the silhouette. 'Weeping' elms are often spared infection owing to the beetles' aversion to hanging upside-down while feeding.

Mechanism
In an attempt to block the fungus from spreading farther, the tree reacts by plugging its own xylem tissue with gum and tyloses, bladder-like extensions of the xylem cell wall. As the xylem (one of the two types of vascular tissue produced by the vascular cambium, the other being the phloem) delivers water and nutrients to the rest of the plant, these plugs prevent them from travelling up the trunk of the tree, starving the tree of water and nutrients, therefore, eventually killing it.

Symptoms
The first symptom of infection is usually an upper branch of the tree with leaves starting to wither and yellow in summer, months before the normal autumnal leaf shedding. This morbidity spreads in a progressive manner throughout the tree, with further dieback of branches. Eventually, the roots die, starved of nutrients from the leaves. Often, not all the roots die: the roots of some species, especially the English elm, Ulmus minor 'Atinia' (formerly Ulmus procera), can repeatedly put up suckers, which flourish for approximately 15 years before dying off.

Disease range

Europe
Dutch elm disease was first noticed in continental Europe in 1910, and spread slowly and eventually extended to all other countries except Greece and Finland. Barendina Gerarda Spierenburg compiled records of trees displaying symptoms from 1900 - 1905 onwards in the Netherlands and her publication of this information in 1921 was one part of the start of extensive research and practical measures to try to halt the disease. In addition the fungus that caused the disease was isolated in 1921 in The Netherlands by Bea Schwarz, a pioneering Dutch phytopathologist, and this discovery would lend the disease its name. Following this, in the 1920s and 30s Christine Buisman, working in the Netherlands and USA, identified the sexual stage of the fungal pathogen and also developed methods for experimental infections of elm seedlings that led to selection of resistant trees.

In Britain, the disease was first identified in 1927 by T R Peace on English elm in Hertfordshire. This first strain was a relatively mild one, which killed only a small proportion of elms, more often just killing a few branches, and had largely died out by 1940 owing to its susceptibility to viruses.

In around 1967, a new, far more virulent, strain arrived in Britain, apparently via east coast ports on shipments of rock elm U. thomasii logs from Canada destined for the small-boat industry, confirmed in 1973 when another consignment was examined at Southampton Docks. This strain proved both highly contagious and lethal to European elms; more than 25 million trees died in the United Kingdom alone, while France lost 97% of its elms. The disease spread rapidly northwards, reaching Scotland within 10 years.

By 1990, very few mature elms were left in Britain or much of continental Europe. One of the most distinctive English countryside trees (See John Constable's painting Salisbury Cathedral from the South-West), the English elm U. minor 'Atinia', is particularly susceptible as it is the elm most favoured by the Scolytus beetles. Thirty years after the outbreak of the epidemic, nearly all these trees, which often grew to more than 45 m high, are gone. The species still survives in hedgerows, as the roots are not killed and send up root sprouts ("suckers"). These suckers rarely reach more than 5 m tall before succumbing to a new attack of the fungus. However, established hedges kept low by clipping have remained apparently healthy throughout the nearly 40 years since the onset of the disease in the United Kingdom.

The largest concentrations of mature elms in Europe are now in Amsterdam and The Hague. In 2005, Amsterdam was declared the "Elm City of Europe": the city's streets and canals are lined with at least 75,000 elms, including several generations of research-elms (see below: Resistant trees). Some 30,000 of the 100,000 mature trees in The Hague are elms, planted because of their tolerance of salty sea-winds. Since the 1990s, a programme of antifungal injections of the most prominent 10,000 elms, and of sanitation felling, has reduced annual elm losses in The Hague from 7% to less than 1% (see below: Preventive treatment). The losses are made up by the planting of disease-resistant cultivars. The largest concentration of mature elm trees remaining in England is in Brighton and Hove, East Sussex, where of the 30,000 elms in 1983 15,000 still stand (2005 figures), several of which are estimated to be over 400 years old. Their survival is owing to the isolation of the area, between the English Channel and the South Downs, and the assiduous efforts of local authorities to identify and remove infected sections of trees immediately when they show symptoms of the disease. Empowered by the Dutch Elm Disease (Local Authorities) (Amendment) Order 1988, local authorities may order the destruction of any infected trees or timber, although in practice they usually do it themselves, successfully reducing the numbers of elm bark beetle Scolytus spp., the vector of elm disease. Sanitary felling has also, to date, preserved most of the 250,000 elms on the Isle of Man, where average temperature and wind speed inhibit the activity of the beetles, which need a temperature of at least 20 degrees to fly and a wind speed of less than five metres per second.  The largest concentration of mature elms in Scotland is in Edinburgh, where over 5000 remained in 2009 from some 35,000 in 1976. The city council gives the overall number of elms as 15,000 (2016). Edinburgh's Leith Links and Meadows have some of the highest concentrations of mature elms among U.K. parks (2014). A policy of sanitary felling has kept losses in the city to an average of 1000 a year. Elm was the most common tree in Paris from the 17th century; before the 1970s there were some 30,000 ormes parisiens. Today, only 1000 mature elms survive in the city, including examples in the large avenues (Avenue d'Italie, Avenue de Choisy, Boulevard Lefebvre, Boulevard de Grenelle, Boulevard Garibaldi) and two very old specimens, one in the garden of the Tuileries in front of the l'Orangerie and another in the Place Saint-Gervais in front of l'hôtel de ville de Paris. Losses are now being made up with disease-resistant cultivars, especially the Dutch-French research elm 'Nanguen', named for the ancient Roman name for the city: Lutetia.

North America

DED was first reported in the United States in 1928, with the beetles believed to have arrived in a shipment of logs from the Netherlands destined for use as veneer in the Ohio furniture industry. Quarantine and sanitation procedures held most cases within 150 miles of metropolitan New York City until 1941 when war demands began to curtail them. The disease spread from New England westward and southward, almost completely destroying the famous elms in the "Elm City" of New Haven, Connecticut, reaching the Detroit area in 1950, the Chicago area by 1960, and Minneapolis by 1970. Of the estimated 77 million elms in North America in 1930, over 75% had been lost by 1989.

The disease first appeared on the planted rows of American elm trees (Ulmus americana) on the National Mall in Washington, D.C., during the 1950s and reached a peak in the 1970s. The United States National Park Service (NPS) used a number of methods to control the epidemic, including sanitation, pruning, injecting trees with fungicide and replanting with DED-resistant American elm cultivars (see Ulmus americana cultivars). The NPS combated the disease's local insect vector, the smaller European elm bark beetle (Scolytus multistriatus), by trapping and by spraying with insecticides. As a result, the population of American elms planted on the Mall and its surrounding areas has remained intact for more than 80 years.

DED reached eastern Canada during World War II, and spread to Ontario in 1967, Manitoba in 1975 and Saskatchewan in 1981. In Toronto, 80% of the elm trees have been lost to Dutch elm disease; many more fell victim in Ottawa, Montreal and other cities during the 1970s and 1980s. Quebec City still has about 21,000 elms, thanks to a prevention program initiated in 1981. Alberta and British Columbia are the only provinces that are currently free of Dutch elm disease, although, in an isolated case, an elm tree in Wainwright, Alberta, was found diseased in June 1998 and was immediately destroyed. The presence of DED was monitored in this area during subsequent years but was not seen again. Today, Alberta has the largest number of elms unaffected by Dutch elm disease in the world.

The provinces of Alberta, Manitoba, and Saskatchewan all prohibit the pruning of elm trees during the middle of the year (taking effect in April, and lasting through the end of September, July, and August respectively), which they deem to be the most active time of year for bark beetles. It is also illegal to use, store, sell, or transport elm firewood.

The largest surviving urban forest of elm trees in North America is believed to be in the city of Winnipeg, where close to 200,000 elms remain – at least double that of Amsterdam, the "Elm City of Europe". The city spends $3 million annually to aggressively combat the disease using Dursban Turf and the Dutch Trig vaccine.

New Zealand
Dutch elm disease has reached New Zealand. It was found in Napier where it was eradicated and was also found in the Auckland Region in 1989. The Ministry of Agriculture funded a national management programme but it was cancelled to allow more funds to be available for pests of a higher priority. A major outbreak occurred in New Zealand in July 2013, particularly at the site of Kingseat Hospital, south of Auckland. Auckland has 20,000 elms.

Preventive treatment

Mechanical
The first attempts to control Dutch elm disease consisted of pruning trees to remove and burn diseased timber. While this method was effective in New York State and adjacent areas, its cost made it uneconomical except in large cities where elms were considered valuable attractions.

Chemical
In the US, when Dutch elm disease spread away from the Atlantic coast, control focused on controlling the bark beetle by using insecticides such as DDT and dieldrin, which were sprayed heavily across all parts of elm trees, usually twice a year in the spring and again at a lower concentration in the summer. In its early years, it was generally thought by observers that pesticides did slow the spread of the disease across the United States but as early as 1947, concern was raised that many bird species were killed in large numbers by ingesting poisoned invertebrates. In areas sprayed during the 1950s, local people observed birds such as the American woodcock, American robin, white-breasted nuthatch, brown creeper and various Poecile species dying. Biologist Rachel Carson consequently argued for improved sanitation and against spraying elms, which she saw as having been more effective in areas with earlier and greater experience countering Dutch elm disease. Although modern critics of Carson have argued that the bird deaths were caused by other factors such as mercury poisoning in the soil, spraying against elm bark beetles declined very rapidly after 1962, a trend aided by fungicides without dangerous side-effects being discovered for the first time after many years of research.

Lignasan BLP (carbendazim phosphate), introduced in the 1970s, was the first fungicide used to control Dutch elm disease. This had to be injected into the base of the tree using specialized equipment, and was never especially effective. It is still sold under the name "Elm Fungicide".

Arbotect (thiabendazole hypophosphite) became available some years later, and it has been proven effective. Arbotect must be injected every two to three years to provide ongoing control; the disease generally cannot be eradicated once a tree is infected. Arbotect is not effective on root graft infections from adjacent elm trees.  It is more than 99.5% effective for three years from beetle infections, which is the primary mode of tree infection.

Alamo (propiconazole) has become available more recently, though several university studies show it to be effective only for the current season in which it is injected.  Alamo is primarily recommended for treatment of oak wilt.

Multistriatin is a pheromone produced by female elm bark beetles, which can be produced synthetically. It has potential in being used to trap male beetles, which carry the fungus.

Biological
Because of the ban on the use of chemicals on street and park trees in the Netherlands, the University of Amsterdam developed a biological vaccine by the late 1980s. Dutch Trig is nontoxic, consisting of a suspension in distilled water of spores of a strain of the fungus Verticillium albo-atrum that has lost much of its pathogenic capabilities, injected in the elm in spring. The strain is believed to have enough pathogenicity left to induce an immune response in the elm, protecting it against DED during one growing season. This is called induced resistance. Trials with the American elm have been very successful; in a six-year experiment with the American elm in Denver, CO, annual Dutch elm disease losses declined significantly after the first year from 7 percent to between 0.4 and 0.6 percent; a greater and more rapid reduction in disease incidence than the accompanying tree sanitation and plant health care programs.

Preventive treatment is usually justified only when a tree has unusual symbolic value or occupies a particularly important place in the landscape.

Resistant trees

Research to select resistant cultivars and varieties began in the Netherlands in 1928, followed by the United States in 1937 (see Ulmus americana cultivars). Initial efforts in the Netherlands involved crossing varieties of U. minor and U. glabra, but later included the Himalayan or Kashmir elm U. wallichiana as a source of antifungal genes. Early efforts in the USA involved the hybridization of the Siberian elm U. pumila with American red elm U. rubra to produce resistant trees. Resulting cultivars lacked the traditional shape and landscape value of the American elm; few were planted.

In 2005, the National Elm Trial (USA) began a 10-year evaluation of 19 cultivars in plantings across the United States. The trees in the trial were exclusively American developments; no European cultivars were included. Based on the trial's final ratings, the preferred cultivars of the American elm (Ulmus americana) are ‘New Harmony’ and ‘Princeton’. The preferred cultivars of Asian elms are the Morton Arboretum introductions and ‘New Horizon’.

Recent research in Sweden has established that early-flushing clones are less susceptible to DED owing to an asynchrony between DED susceptibility and infection.

Testing for disease resistance
Elms are tested for resistance by inoculation with the fungal pathogen in late May when the tree's growth is at its annual peak. Clones raised for testing are grown to an age of 3 or 4 years. In Europe, the inoculum is introduced into the cambium by a knife wound. However this method, developed in the Netherlands, was considered too severe in America, where the principal disease vector is the bark beetle Scolytus multistriatus, a far less effective vector than the larger beetle endemic to Europe, Scolytus scolytus, which is unknown in America. In the method devised by the USDA, the inoculum is introduced to the cambium via a 2 mm-diameter hole drilled through the bark in the lower third of the tree. This method was further refined by the University of Wisconsin team, which drilled holes in the branches to simulate natural infection by the bark beetles feeding in the twig crotches, but results from this method were found to exaggerate the genetic resistance of the host. Consequently, tests were conducted on specimens in a controlled environment, either in greenhouses or customized plant chambers, facilitating more accurate evaluation of both internal and external symptoms of disease.

Another variable is the composition of the inoculum; while an inoculum strength of 106 spores /  ml is standard in both continents, its composition reflects the different Ophiostoma species, subspecies and hybrids endemic to the two continents. In Italy for example, two subspecies, americana and novo-ulmi, are present together with their hybrid, whereas in North America, ssp. novo-ulmi is unknown. The differences in method and inocula possibly explain why the American cultivar 'Princeton', displaying high resistance in the US, has often succumbed to Dutch elm disease in Europe.

Hybrid cultivars

Many attempts to breed disease-resistant cultivar hybrids have involved a genetic contribution from Asian elm species that are demonstrably resistant to this fungal disease. Much of the early work was undertaken in the Netherlands. The Dutch research programme began in 1928, and ended in 1992. During those 64 years, well over 1000 cultivars were raised and evaluated. Still in use are cultivars such as 'Groeneveld', 'Lobel', 'Dodoens', 'Clusius' and 'Plantijn', although the resistance levels in these trees aren't high enough to confer good protection. The programme had three major successes: 'Columella', 'Nanguen' , and 'Wanoux' , all found to have an extremely high resistance to the disease when inoculated with unnaturally large doses of the fungus. Only 'Columella' was released during the Dutch programme’s lifetime—-in 1987.

Asian species featured in the American DED research programs were the Siberian elm U. pumila, Japanese elm U. davidiana var. japonica, and the Chinese elm U. parvifolia, which gave rise to several dozen hybrid cultivars resistant not just to DED, but also to the extreme cold of Asian winters. Among the most widely planted of these, both in North America and in Europe, are 'Sapporo Autumn Gold', 'New Horizon' and 'Rebona'. Some hybrid cultivars, such as 'Regal' and 'Pioneer' are the product of both Dutch and American research.  Hybridization experiments using the slippery (or red) elm U. rubra resulted in the release of 'Coolshade' and 'Rosehill' in the 1940s and 50s; the species last featured in hybridization as the female parent of 'Repura' and 'Revera', both patented in 1993, although neither has yet appeared in commerce.

In Italy, research was initiated at the Istituto per la Protezione delle Piante, Florence, to produce a range of disease-resistant trees adapted to the warmer Mediterranean climate, using a variety of Asiatic species crossed with the early Dutch hybrid 'Plantyn' as a safeguard against any future mutation of the disease. Two trees with very high levels of resistance, 'San Zanobi' and 'Plinio', were released in 2003. 'Arno' and 'Fiorente' were patented in 2006 and entered commerce in 2012. All four have the Siberian elm U. pumila as a parent, the source of disease-resistance and drought-tolerance genes. 'Morfeo' was released in 2011; it arose from a crossing of the Dutch hybrid clone '405' (female parent) and the Chenmou Elm, the latter a small tree from the provinces of Anhui and Jiangsu in eastern China, The '405' clone is a crossing of an English U. × hollandica and a French U. minor.

In the Netherlands a new program has been initiated. From the old proving grounds of the Dorschkamp Research Institute, 10 fourth-generation hybrids survive in a DED-ridden area. These have been tested and some have a very high level of resistance. At Noordplant Nursery new hybrids have been tested since 2013.

Species and species cultivars

North America

Ten resistant American elm cultivars are now in commerce in North America. No cultivar is immune to DED; even highly resistant cultivars can become infected, particularly if already stressed by drought or other environmental conditions where the disease prevalence is high.  With the exception of 'Princeton', no trees have yet been grown to maturity; trees cannot be said to be mature until they have reached an age of 60 years.

Notable cultivars include:
 'Princeton', is a cultivar selected in 1922 by Princeton Nurseries for its landscape merit.  By coincidence, this cultivar was found to be highly resistant in inoculation studies carried out by the USDA in the early 1990s.  As trees planted in the 1920s still survive, the properties of the mature plant are well known. However, 'Princeton' has not proven resistant in Europe, where the main vector of the disease—the larger elm bark beetle, Scolytus scolytus—is capable of introducing far more fungal spores into the tree; many of the 50 trees planted at Highgrove House in the south-west of England in 2006 had died from Dutch elm disease by 2011.
 'American Liberty', is, in fact, a set of six cultivars of moderate to high resistance produced through selection over several generations starting in the 1970s.  Although 'American Liberty' is marketed as a single variety, nurseries selling the "Liberty Elm" actually distribute the six cultivars at random and thus, unfortunately, the resistance of any particular tree cannot be known. One of the cultivars, 'Independence', is covered by patent (U. S. Plant patent 6227). The oldest 'American Liberty' elm was planted in about 1980.
 'Valley Forge', released in 1995, has demonstrated the highest resistance of all the clones to Dutch elm disease in controlled USDA tests.
 'Lewis and Clark' = , released in 2004 to commemorate the bicentenary of the Lewis & Clark expedition, was cloned from a tree found growing in North Dakota which had survived unscathed when all around had succumbed to disease.

In 2007, the Elm Recovery Project of the University of Guelph Arboretum in Ontario, Canada, reported that cuttings from healthy surviving old elms surveyed across Ontario had been grown to produce a bank of resistant trees, isolated for selective breeding of highly resistant cultivars.

The University of Minnesota USA is testing various elms, including a huge now-patented century-old survivor known as "The St. Croix Elm", which is located in a Minneapolis-St. Paul, MN suburb (Afton) in the St. Croix River valley—a designated National Scenic Riverway.

The slippery or red elm U. rubra is marginally less susceptible to Dutch elm disease than the other American species, but this quality seems to have been largely ignored in American research. No cultivars were ever selected, although the tree was used in hybridization experiments (see above).

In 1993, Mariam B. Sticklen and James L. Sherald reported the results of NPS-funded experiments conducted at Michigan State University in East Lansing that were designed to apply genetic engineering techniques to the development of DED-resistant strains of American elm trees. In 2007, AE Newhouse and F Schrodt of the State University of New York College of Environmental Science and Forestry in Syracuse reported that young transgenic American elm trees had shown reduced DED symptoms and normal mycorrhizal colonization. By 2013, researchers in both New York State and North Carolina were conducting field trials of genetically engineered DED-resistant American elms.

Europe
Among European species, there is the unique example of the European white elm U. laevis, which has little innate resistance to DED, but is eschewed by the vector bark beetles and only rarely becomes infected. Recent research has indicated it is the presence of certain organic compounds, such as triterpenes and sterols, which serves to make the tree bark unattractive to the beetle species that spread the disease.

In Europe the testing of clones of surviving field elms for innate resistance has been carried out since the 1990s by national research institutes, with findings centrally assessed and published. The first results of this ongoing project suggest that in some countries a very small number of native field elm genotypes have comparatively high levels of tolerance to DED. In Spain, for example, of around 5,000 native elms evaluated to 2013, some 25 genotypes (0.5% of those tested) fall into this category; and it is now hoped that the controlled crossing of the best seven of these (genetically and aesthetically) will produce Ulmus minor hybrids with effective 'field resistance' and market appeal. Similar results are beginning to emerge in trials on surviving field elms in Greece.

United Kingdom 
Much of the work in the United Kingdom is by the Forestry Commission's research arm, which has had Dutch elm disease on its agenda since the 1920s.  In 1994 a Research Information Note (no 252) was published, written by John Gibbs, Clive Brasier and Joan Webber, and in 2010 a Pathology Advisory Note, as well as throughout the period a stream of more academic papers: notable results have been the observation that the progress of the disease through Scotland has been quite slow, and that genetic engineering has been tried to improve the resistance of the English elm.

In England the Conservation Foundation had been propagating, distributing and planting clones of surviving indigenous elms, including field elms (but not the highly susceptible English elm), as part of a scheme to return elms to city and countryside. The Foundation was running two elm programmes: the 'Great British Elm Experiment' and 'Ulmus londinium', an elm programme for London – these use saplings cultivated through micropropagation from mature parent elms found growing in the British countryside: parent trees are monitored for disease, while saplings were offered free to schools and community groups, who are asked to monitor their trees' progress on the Foundation's online elm map; in London, places with 'elm' in their name were offered a sapling – in an attempt to find out why some elms have survived while others succumbed to Dutch elm disease. Both these projects have been discontinued. 
The spread of DED to Scotland has focussed attention on a small number of Wych elms U. glabra surviving in areas of high infectivity, prompting the Royal Botanic Garden Edinburgh to begin a programme of cloning of the trees and inoculation of their saplings with the fungus, with a view to determining innate resistance (2010).

In 2001–2004, English elm U. minor 'Atinia' was genetically engineered to resist disease, in experiments at Abertay University, Dundee, Scotland, by transferring antifungal genes into the elm genome using minute DNA-coated ball bearings. However, owing to reservations to GM developments, there are no plans to release the trees into the countryside.

Spain 
In Spain, the Escuela Técnica Superior de Ingenieros de Montes, Universidad Politecnica de Madrid , charged with discovering disease-resistant elms for use in forestry, has raised and patented seven cultivars of the field elm Ulmus minor, although two have subsequently been found to have Siberian elm U. pumila DNA, the species introduced to Spain in the 16th century.  Although none have been released to commerce (2020), the clone 'Ademuz', pure U. minor, has been imported into the UK since 2014, and widely planted there.

Possible earlier occurrences

The 'Elm Decline'
From analysis of fossil pollen in peat samples, it is apparent that elms, an abundant tree in prehistoric times, all but disappeared from northwestern Europe during the mid-Holocene period around 4000 BC, and to a lesser extent around 1000 BC. This roughly synchronous and widespread event has come to be known as the 'Elm Decline'. When first detected in the mid-20th century, the decline was attributed to the impact of forest-clearance by Neolithic farmers, and of elm-coppicing for animal fodder, though the numbers of settlers could not have been large. The devastation caused recently by DED has provided an alternative explanation. Examination of subfossil elm wood showing signs of the changes associated with the disease has suggested that a form of DED may have been responsible. Fossil finds from this period of elm bark beetles support this theory. A consensus today is that the Elm Decline was probably driven by both factors.

Historic period
A less devastating form of the disease, caused by a different fungus, had possibly been present in north-west Europe for some time. Dr Oliver Rackham of Cambridge University presented evidence of an outbreak of elm disease in north-west Europe, c. 1819–1867. "Indications from annual rings [a reference to the dark staining in an annual ring in infected elms] confirm that Dutch elm disease was certainly present in 1867," he wrote, quoting contemporary accounts of diseased and dying elms, including this passage in Richard Jefferies' 1883 book, Nature near London:

There is something wrong with elm trees. In the early part of this summer, not long after the leaves were fairly out upon them, here and there a branch appeared as if it had been touched with red-hot iron and burnt up, all the leaves withered and browned on the boughs. First one tree was thus affected, then another, then a third, till, looking round the fields, it seemed as if every fourth or fifth tree had thus been burnt. [...] Upon mentioning this I found that it had been noticed in elm avenues and groups a hundred miles distant, so that it is not a local circumstance.

Earlier still, Rackham noted, "The name Scolytus destructor was given to the great bark beetle on evidence, dating from c. 1780, that it was destroying elms around Oxford."

In Belgium, elm die-back and death was observed in 1836 and 1896 in Brussels, and in 1885–1886 in Ghent. In the later outbreaks the die-back was attributed to the elm bark beetle.

It has been suggested that "for thousands of years elms have flourished in natural balance with the scolytidae, combating occasional infections of Dutch elm disease."

Sir Thomas Browne, writing in 1658, noted in The Garden of Cyrus an elm disease that was spreading through English hedgerows, and described symptoms reminiscent of DED.

See also
 Forest pathology
 Forest disturbance by invasive insects and diseases in the United States

References

Further reading
 Walter E. Burton "Army of Experts Wage War on Dutch Elm Disease" Popular Science Monthly, May 1937

External links
resistantelms.co.uk
Dutchelmdisease.org
Elm Recovery Project – Guelph University, Canada
Dutch elm disease at Government of British Columbia
Dutch elm disease – gallery of pests
Species profile – Dutch elm disease (Ophiostoma ulmi and Ophiostoma novo-ulmi), National Invasive Species Information Center, United States National Agricultural Library. Lists general information and resources for Dutch elm disease.

Fungal tree pathogens and diseases

Biological events
Forest history
Natural history
Holarctic
Northern Hemisphere